Panarin is a Russian masculine surname, its feminine counterpart is Panarina. It may refer to

 Aleksandr Panarin (born 1987), Russian professional football player
 Artemi Panarin (born 1991), Russian professional ice hockey winger
 Igor Panarin (born 1958), Russian professor, academician, political scientist, writer and intelligence analyst
Olga Panarina (born 1985), Belarusian track cyclist

Russian-language surnames